Joseph Bennett (1894–1931) was an American film actor of the silent era.  He played a mixture of lead and supporting roles for a variety of studios. He was often credited as Joe Bennett.

Selected filmography

 Indiscreet Corinne (1917)
 Limousine Life (1918)
 The Golden Fleece (1918)
 Faith Endurin' (1918)
 The Love Brokers (1918)
 The Last Rebel (1918)
 Marked Cards (1918)
 The Grey Parasol (1918)
 Crown Jewels (1918)
 Man's Desire (1919)
 The Feud (1919)
 The Terror (1920)
 The Gamesters (1920)
 Youth's Desire (1920)
 Their Mutual Child (1920)
 A Daughter of the Law (1921)
 The Home Stretch (1921)
 The Night Horsemen (1921)
 Love Never Dies (1921)
 Elope If You Must (1922)
 Flashing Spurs (1924)
 Trigger Fingers (1924)
 Barbara Frietchie (1924)
 Breed of the Border (1924)
 The Sign of the Claw (1926)
 The Man in the Shadow (1926)
 God's Great Wilderness (1927)
 Men of Daring (1927)
 Three Miles Up (1927)
 Straight Shootin' (1927)
 Somewhere in Sonora (1927)
 Wolf's Trail (1927)
 The Shepherd of the Hills (1928)
 Vultures of the Sea (1928)
 Won in the Clouds (1928)
 The Girl Who Wouldn't Wait (1929)
 The Lariat Kid (1929)
 After the Fog (1929)

References

Bibliography
 Langman, Larry. American Film Cycles: The Silent Era. Greenwood Publishing, 1998.
 Taves, Brian. P.G. Wodehouse and Hollywood: Screenwriting, Satires and Adaptations. McFarland, 2006.

External links

1894 births
1931 deaths
American male film actors
Male actors from Los Angeles
20th-century American male actors